Journey Beneath the Desert is a 1961 adventure film based on the novel Atlantida by Pierre Benoit.

Cast 
 Jean-Louis Trintignant - Pierre
 Haya Harareet - Queen Antinea
 Georges Rivière - John
 Rad Fulton - Robert 
 Amedeo Nazzari - Tamal
 Gian Maria Volonté - Tarath
 Giulia Rubini - Zinah
 Gabriele Tinti - Max
 Ignazio Dolce

Production
Frank Borzage was slated to direct the film and began production but left due to an illness and was replaced with Edgar G. Ulmer.

Release
Journey Beneath the Desert was released in Italy on 5 May 1961. It was released in France on 28 June 1961.

Footnotes

References

External links 

1961 adventure films
1961 films
Italian adventure films
French adventure films
Films based on Atlantida
Films directed by Edgar G. Ulmer
Films directed by Frank Borzage
Films set in Atlantis
Films set in Africa
Films set in deserts
1960s Italian films
1960s French films